Stephen Susco is an American screenwriter, producer, and director. He is best known for writing horror films such as The Grudge, The Grudge 2, and Texas Chainsaw 3D. His directorial debut film, Unfriended: Dark Web, had its premiere at SXSW on March 9, 2018.

Early life and education
Susco graduated from the University of Notre Dame in 1995 and from USC School of Cinematic Arts in 1999.

Career
Susco appears as a character in Jonathan Maberry's Ghost Road Blues trilogy, alongside Ken Foree, Jim O'Rear, Tom Savini, and Debbie Rochon. Susco also wrote the 2008 film Red and then he wrote Texas Chainsaw 3D, which released in 2013 by Lionsgate. He wrote the storybook to the Paramount Pictures project The Butcherhouse Chronicles. He also co-wrote and co-produced the Adrien Brody film, High School. In 2018, his directorial debut film, Unfriended: Dark Web premiered at SXSW on March 9.

Personal life
Susco married author Bridget Foley in 2005. They live in Bellevue, Washington and have two children.

Filmography

References

External links

Living people
American male screenwriters
University of Notre Dame alumni
USC School of Cinematic Arts alumni
1974 births